Hyderabad State was a state in Dominion and later Republic of India, formed after the accession of the State of Hyderabad into the Union on 17 September 1948. It existed from 1948 to 1956.

Following the States Reorganisation Act, which implemented a linguistic reorganization of states, the Hyderabad state was dissolved. Its different sections were merged with Andhra State, Mysore State and Bombay State respectively.

History

Military Governor

After the Annexation into the Indian Union, Major General J. N. Chaudhuri who led Operation Polo stayed on as Military Governor till December 1949.

The state witnessed Mulkhi agitation in 1952 by the locals after government jobs meant for the locals were given to non-locals.

Rajpramukh
Hyderabad State had its last Nizam, HEH Mir Osman Ali Khan (1886–1967) as Rajpramukh from 26 January 1950 to 31 October 1956.

Elections
In the first State Assembly election in India, 1952, Dr. Burgula Ramakrishna Rao was elected Chief minister of Hyderabad State. During this time there were violent agitations by some Telanganites to send back bureaucrats from Madras state, and to strictly implement 'Mulki-rules'(Local jobs for locals only), which was part of Hyderabad state law since 1919.

List of districts of Hyderabad State
Administratively, Hyderabad State was made up of sixteen districts, grouped into four divisions:

Linguistic reorganization
In 1956 during the reorganisation of the Indian states based along linguistic lines, the Telugu-speaking region of the state of Hyderabad State was merged with Andhra State. The Marathi speaking region was merged with Bombay State and Kannada speaking region with Mysore State.

The States Reorganisation Commission (SRC) was not in favour of an immediate merger of Telugu speaking Telangana region of Hyderabad State with Andhra State, despite their common language. Para 378 of the SRC report said One of the principal causes of opposition of Vishalandhra also seems to be the apprehension felt by the educationally backward people of Telangana that they may be swamped and exploited by the more advanced people of the coastal areas.

Andhra state and Hyderabad State were merged to form Andhra Pradesh on 1 November 1956, after providing safeguards to Telangana in the form of Gentlemen's agreement. But in June 2014, Telangana re-emerged as a separate state. Hyderabad city will continue to be the capital of both Andhra Pradesh and Telangana for 10 years.

Chief Ministers of Hyderabad State
Hyderabad State included nine Telugu districts of Telangana, four Kannada districts in Gulbarga division and four Marathi districts in Aurangabad division.

See also
 Nizams Hyderabad State (1724–1948)

Notes

References

Sources

Further reading 
 

States and territories established in 1948
History of Hyderabad, India
History of Telangana
History of Andhra Pradesh (1947–2014)
States and territories disestablished in 1956
1956 disestablishments in India
Former states and territories of India